Sodankylä is a municipality of Finland. It is located in the region of Lapland, and lies at the northern end of Highway 5 (E63) and along Highway 4 (E75). The Kitinen River flows near the center of Sodankylä. Its neighbouring municipalities are Inari, Kemijärvi, Kittilä, Pelkosenniemi, Rovaniemi, and Savukoski. The municipality has two official languages: Finnish and Northern Sami.

Sodankylä has an airfield. Also, one of EISCAT's scientific radar receiver stations is located outside Sodankylä, at the site of the Sodankylä Geophysical Observatory. The urban area around the observatory is known as "Tähtelä", which translates as "Place of Stars", although the observatory does not observe stars. The Jaeger Brigade of the Finnish Army is also located in Sodankylä. Although the name "Sodankylä" and (also "Soađegilli") directly translate to "Village of War", the etymology of the name is from a surname Sova rather than the word "war".

Since 1986, Sodankylä has been home to the Midnight Sun Film Festival.

Key sights, events and destinations
 Sodankylä Local History Museum
 The Old Church (made 1689 of wood), The New Church (made 1859 of stone)
 Tankavaara, gold museum, gold village
 Ilmakkiaapa peatland protection area (35 km north)
 Urho Kekkonen National Park (Koilliskaira Visitor Centre)
 Luosto – a hill home to the only open amethyst mine in Europe
 Hotel Sodankylä and Hotel Bear Inn (Hotelli Karhu)
 Midnight Sun Film Festival (annually mid-June)
 Museum-Gallery Alariesto (Andreas Alariesto's life and artwork)
 Pappilanniemi walking trail
 Igloo village of Kakslauttanen

The old church

The old church is one of the oldest churches in Lapland. The church was built in 1689 for the people of Middle Lapland. It was restored in 1926, and the shingles and the boarding were re-done between 1991 and 1995 by the National Board of Antiquities and Historical Monuments. The church is still open at summer time.

The statue "A reindeer and a Lapp"
Sculptor Ensio Seppänen designed this statue in 1970, located in the center of Sodankylä. The bronze statue presents reindeer husbandry, which still is one of the most important trades in Sodankylä.

Tankavaara Gold Museum

The International Gold Museum of Tankavaara presents the history of Finnish gold, as well as the history of the world's major gold rushes. A display called Golden world, tells the story of gold in more than 20 countries. The outdoor museum is housed within several historic buildings and the courtyard is decorated with a large bronze statue of a gold prospector, by the artist professor Ensio Seppänen. The museum's stone and mineral collection has more than 2500 samples on display from around the world.

Museum-gallery Alariesto
Andreas Alariesto (1900-1986) was painter from Sodankylä.

Museum-Gallery Alariesto was opened in July 1986. The museum's permanent exhibition displays artist Andreas Alariesto's life and works. Museum-Gallery is maintenanted by Riikkas and Andreas Alariesto's Lapinkuvat (pictures of Lapland) Foundation and the Municipality of Sodankylä. The foundations's main goal is to take care of Alariesto's collected works and to preserve old Sompio's distinctive cultural tradition.

Geography

Sodankylä lies just north of the Arctic Circle.

Climate
Sodankylä has a subarctic climate (Koppen: Dfc), with short, mild summers and long, freezing, extremely snowy winters. However global warming has brought more extreme snowfalls, typically an increase. Its extreme northerly location combined with frequent overcast skies leads to very low amounts of sunshine in the winter months; December will average just under two minutes of sunshine daily. Sodankylä experiences polar night between 20 and 23 December and polar day between 31 May and 14 July.

Twin towns
  Kola, Russia, since 1968
  Berlevåg, Norway, since 1971
  Norsjö, Sweden, since 1977
  Heiligenblut, Austria, since 1979
  Révfülöp, Hungary

Gallery

Notable people
 

 Andreas Alariesto (1900–1989), painter
 Benjamin Anneberg (1865–1925), lawyer and politician
 Aleksi Hihnavaara (1882–1938), frontiersman and reindeer herder
 Kaija Kärkinen (born 1962), singer and actress
 Maria Lähteenmäki (born 1957), history researcher and university professor
 Lasse Näsi (1930–2022), politician
 Katja Riipi (born 1975), retired ice hockey player
 Johanna Sinisalo (born 1958), science fiction and fantasy writer
 Pertti Ukkola (born 1950), wrestler and Olympic champion

See also
Sodankylä Airfield
Unari

References

External links

 Municipality of Sodankylä – Official website
 Midnight Sun Film Festival
 Tankavaara, goldvillage
 Gold goldmuseum
 Koilliskaira Visitor Centre
 Urho Kekkonen National Park
 The Sodankylä Geophysical Observatory

 
Sámi-language municipalities
Mining towns in Finland
Populated places of Arctic Finland
Populated places established in 1893